QNAP Systems, Inc. is a Taiwanese corporation that specializes in network-attached storage (NAS) appliances used for file sharing, virtualization, storage management and surveillance applications. Headquartered in Xizhi District, New Taipei City, Taiwan, QNAP has offices in 16 countries and employs over 1000 people around the world.

QNAP has been a member of the Intel Intelligent Systems Alliance since 2011.

Company history 
QNAP originally existed as a department within the IEI Integration Corporation, an industrial computing service provider located in Taiwan. In 2004, QNAP Systems Inc. was spun off into a separate company.

Company milestones 
 July 2020 – QuTScloud c4.5.1 is released.
 October 2020 – QTS 4.5.1 is released.
 November 2020 – QuTS hero h4.5.1 is released.

Product overview

QNAP primarily produces Network-Attached Storage (NAS) appliances. The company also produces Network Video Recorders (NVR) and a series of networking equipment.

 QTS – an operating system for NAS devices
 QES (QNAP Enterprise Storage)
 QuTS hero – an operating system similar to QTS that implements ZFS
 QuTScloud
 QNE
 QSS
 QuRouter
 The QNAP QHora-301W supports high-speed Wi-Fi 6 and 10GbE connections, while also providing an enterprise-grade SD-WAN VPN to allow multi-site VPN deployment via the cloud.

Vulnerabilities and attacks

In 2021, SAM security group reported that it had discovered critical vulnerabilities in QNAP NAS devices. SAM security group said that these would mean that remote attackers could "execute arbitrary shell commands ... [or] create arbitrary file data on any (non-existing) location ... [or] execute arbitrary commands on the remote NAS". The company said that it had informed QNAP of the vulnerabilities in 2020 but that, four months after being informed, QNAP had not addressed these. The article was later updated to clarify that QNAP had resolved the problems for the most recent devices, but not for older systems, and then that QNAP had revised and released firmware for older devices.

These critical vulnerabilities were reported by Bleeping Computer to be implicated in a massive ransomware attack on QNAP NAS devices in April 2021. This attack, named "Qlocker", compressed all files smaller than 20 MiB into 7z files using 7-Zip with a 32 character long password. In order to retrieve the password, users had to access an .onion webpage and pay 0.01 BTC. This caused losses of at least $260,000 for users.

In January 2022 some QNAP NAS devices were affected by a ransomware infection known as DeadBolt. There were further attacks in March and May 2022.

Achievements
2019
TS-1677X named Best NAS Device of European Hardware Awards 2019

2018

Received the COMPUTEX Best Choice Award 2018

2017
TS-451+ named Best NAS Device of European Hardware Awards 2017

2016

Received the COMPUTEX Best Choice Award 2016

2014

Received ISO 27001:2013 certification in information security management
Received 2014 iF Product Design Award
 Featured in PCWorld's 50 Best Tech Products of 2013

See also
 List of companies of Taiwan

References

External links

 
 
 QNAP Blog

Manufacturing companies based in New Taipei
Companies established in 2004
Computer storage companies
Linux-based devices
Server appliance
Taiwanese brands
Electronics companies of Taiwan
Companies based in Taipei
Computer companies established in 2004
Taiwanese companies established in 2004
Software companies of Taiwan
Cloud storage
Storage Area Network companies
Image organizers
Backup software
Data protection
Networking hardware companies
Privately held companies of Taiwan